David Fredrick Bjorklund (born June 13, 1949) is an American professor of psychology at Florida Atlantic University. His areas of research interest include cognitive development and evolutionary developmental psychology. His works include authoring several books and over 130  scientific papers.  He is editor of the peer-reviewed Journal of Experimental Child Psychology.

Bjorklund was born in Worcester, Massachusetts. He received a Ph.D., 1976 from the University of North Carolina at Chapel Hill in Developmental psychology. In addition to his professorship at FAU, he has been visiting professor at Max Planck Institute for Psychological Research, Munich, Germany; University of Georgia, and Emory University.

Books authored and edited

See also
 Evolutionary developmental psychology

Notes

External links
 Bjorklund's FAU Home Page
 

1949 births
Living people
People from Worcester, Massachusetts
21st-century American psychologists
American developmental psychologists
Evolutionary psychologists
Florida Atlantic University faculty
University of North Carolina at Chapel Hill alumni
Academic journal editors
20th-century American psychologists